Zentyal (previously known as eBox Platform) is an open source email and groupware solution based on Ubuntu Linux.

Zentyal implements the Microsoft Exchange Server protocols on top of standard open source components (such as Dovecot, Postfix, Samba, etc.) in order to provide native compatibility with Microsoft Outlook clients. As of release 5, Zentyal has dropped native compatibility with Microsoft Outlook using the MAPI protocol via OpenChange, due to unspecified issues. The OpenChange project was discontinued in December 2015.

The email and groupware protocols supported by Zentyal are ActiveSync, SMTP, POP, IMAP, CalDAV, CardDAV and Active Directory.

Zentyal is distributed in two packages: Zentyal Server for SMBs and Zentyal Cloud for hosting providers. Zentyal Server has a development edition that is freely downloadable and its source code is available under terms of the GNU General Public License.

Main features of Zentyal Server 
 Native compatibility with Microsoft® Exchange Server Protocols (before release 5)
 Support for Microsoft Outlook 2007, 2010 (before release 5)
 Native compatibility with Microsoft Active Directory® 2008, 2008R2, 2012
 Email, calendars, contacts
 Synchronization with mobile devices (ActiveSync® support)
 Antivirus and antispam
 Packaged in an Ubuntu-based server, providing domain and directory, basic networking and firewall services

Protocols Plugfest 
In May 2015, Zentyal organized with Microsoft's sponsorship the first Protocols Plugfest in Europe, aimed at open source communities and technology companies to present, test and discuss technical issues and content around open protocols and interoperability.

Bankruptcy and trial 
In 2016 Zentyal S.L. filed for bankruptcy. In 2019 Zentyal CEO, Ignacio Correas, was found guilty of funds embezzlement.

See also 

 Cloud Software: Cloud computing
 Windows Server
 List of collaborative software
 List of mail server software
 Comparison of mail servers

References 

Enterprise Linux distributions
Ubuntu derivatives
Email server software for Linux
Email-related software for Linux
Microsoft Office-related software
Linux distributions